The Democratic Alliance Party is a liberal political party in Albania. The party was formed in 1992 by Neritan Ceka and other dissidents of the Democratic Party of Albania. They opposed the leadership of the party's leader Sali Berisha.

History 
The founders of the Democratic Alliance, formed the party on the right side of the political spectrum, where some of the former founders of the Democratic Party, its former deputies, as well as the December students. Over time, it moved from the right side towards the centre and in 2008, it presented itself as a liberal party. The Democratic Alliance Party became part of a socialist led government in 1997. In the June 2001 elections it received 2.4% of the vote and three members of parliament. The party continued in government. In the elections in July 2005 it won 3 seats in Parliament. Although they opposed Sali Berisha. In the 2009 election they Joined the Democratic Party and its alliance. Since 2009 the Democratic Alliance has been Extra-parliamentary opposition. In 2013 Party founder Neritan Ceka had been succeed by Eduart Abazi. The Democratic Alliance since 2015 had switched away from the Democratic party and rejoined the Socialist Party's Alliance.

MPS

Election Results

References

1992 establishments in Albania
Centrist parties in Albania
Liberal parties in Albania
Political parties established in 1992
Political parties in Albania